"Star Star" (originally titled "Starfucker") is a song recorded by the English rock band the Rolling Stones. It was written by Mick Jagger and Keith Richards.  The song was released as a single for the band's album Goats Head Soup (1973), with "Doo Doo Doo Doo Doo (Heartbreaker)" as its B-side. The song's title was changed to "Star Star" from "Starfucker" after Ahmet Ertegün of Atlantic Records insisted on the change.

Background
The song gained notoriety not only for explicit lyrics alluding to sex acts involving fruit (among other things) but also for controversial mentions of such celebrities as John Wayne and Steve McQueen. It was released about nine months after Carly Simon's affair with Jagger and the release of the song "You're So Vain", on which Jagger provided background vocals. Simon, who was by now married to fellow singer-songwriter James Taylor, had moved to Hollywood, which is mentioned in the lyrics of "Star Star". The lyric "Yeah, you and me we made a pretty pair" also echoes the verse "well you said that we made such a pretty pair" in "You're So Vain." While discussing the song, the band members have always referred to the song by its original title. A live performance was captured and released on 1977's Love You Live. Atlantic tinkered with the mix in order to suppress the key expletives, but the very first promo copies were pressed unaltered.

The opening lick, stabs in the verses and solo are played by Keith Richards and the rhythm guitar by Mick Taylor. Bill Wyman's bass line enters in at the second verse.

Lyrics and music 
"Star Star" was written by Mick Jagger and Keith Richards. The song was recorded by Andy Johns, Rob Fraboni, and Baker Bigsby at Dynamic Sounds studio in Kingston, Jamaica; Village Recorders in Los Angeles; Island Studios in London; Olympic Studios in London. It was produced by Jimmy Miller.

Musically, "Star Star" is a song with Chuck Berry influences, and opens with the same riff as the song "Johnny B. Goode".

Critical reception 
The BBC boycotted "Star Star", though not before it was played during a late-night news item about the 1973 Wembley concerts, part of the Goats Heads Soup tour. Writing for the Calgary Herald in a retrospective review, Heath McCoy stated that "Star Star" "epitomized the excess of the seventies."

Personnel 
Credits are adapted from Philippe Margotin and Jean-Michel Guesdon's book All the Songs.
 Mick Jagger – lead vocals, writer
 Keith Richards –electric guitar incl. solo background vocals
 Mick Taylor –electric guitar
 Bill Wyman –bass guitar
 Charlie Watts –drums
 Ian Stewart –piano
 Bobby Keys –saxophone
 Jimmy Miller –producer
 Andy Johns –sound engineer
 Rob Fraboni –sound engineer
 Baker Bigsby –sound engineer
 Carlton Lee –assistant sound engineer
 Howard Kilgour –assistant sound engineer
 Doug Bennett –assistant sound engineer

Charts

Cover versions
In 1978, the Swedish artist Magnus Uggla did a punk rock cover of the song with lyrics in Swedish called "Stjärnluder" ("Star Whore") on his album Vittring.
Joan Jett included a completely uncensored version as an unlisted hidden track on the cassette version of her 1983 album Album [MCA, MCAC-5437], which resulted in a ban of this tape by Walmart and other stores. MCA then issued a second cassette version ["Album Only Version"] in a red plastic box [ MCA, MCAC-5445] that deleted the objectionable song. The song reappeared on her Flashback compilation in 1993.
The 1978 Cheech & Chong comedy film Up In Smoke features a cover version of the song during the Strawberry scene.  However, the record skips and repeats the line "Star Fucker, Star" ad infinitum.
Croatian band Psihomodo Pop released their own version of "Star Star", on their 1993 album Srebrne Svinje.
Rikki Rockett, the Poison drummer, covered the song on his 2003 solo album, Glitter 4 Your Soul. "Star Star" was the final track of the album, with Dick Swagger, the lead singer of The Hollywood Stones, assisting Rockett with the vocals.

See also
 "Schoolboy Blues"

References

External links
 

The Rolling Stones songs
1973 songs
Songs written by Jagger–Richards
Song recordings produced by Jimmy Miller
1973 singles
Obscenity controversies in music
Protopunk songs
British rock-and-roll songs
Songs about actors
Songs about groupies
Songs about musicians
Songs banned by the BBC
Virgin Records singles